This is a list of rural localities in Yaroslavl Oblast. Yaroslavl Oblast (Yaroslavskaya oblast) is a federal subject of Russia (an oblast), which is located in the Central Federal District, surrounded by Tver, Moscow, Ivanovo, Vladimir, Kostroma, and Vologda Oblasts. This geographic location affords the oblast the advantages of proximity to Moscow and St. Petersburg. Additionally, the administrative center of the oblast—the city of Yaroslavl—is an intersection of major highways, railroads, and waterways. Population: 1,272,468 (2010 Census).

Locations 
 Abashevo
 Abbakumtsevo
 Bolshoye Maslennikovo
 Bolshoye Selo
 Breytovo
 Glushitsy
 Greshnevo
 Isanino
 Karabikha
 Labunino
 Nazarovo
 Novy Nekouz
 Shurskol
 Vyatskoye

See also 
 
 Lists of rural localities in Russia

References 

Yaroslavl Oblast